"An Old Flame" is the sixth episode of the fifth and final series of the period drama Upstairs, Downstairs. It first aired on 12 October 1975 on ITV.

Background
"An Old Flame" was recorded in the studio on 20  and 21 March 1975. The plot of An Old Flame started as a script by Elizabeth Jane Howard called The Price of Rubies. The Price of Rubies was due to be made for broadcast on 28 September, but for an unknown reason it was dropped and replaced by the quickly-written episode The Joy Ride. The plot of The Price of Rubies, was later taken over by John Hawkesworth, who adapted it into An Old Flame.

Cast
Gordon Jackson - Hudson
Angela Baddeley - Mrs Bridges
Simon Williams - James Bellamy
Celia Bannerman - Diana Newbury
Georgina Hale - Violet Marshall
David Langton - Richard Bellamy
Christopher Beeny - Edward
Karen Dotrice - Lily 
Jacqueline Tong - Daisy
John Quayle - Bunny Newbury
Tom Chatto - The Waiter
Mike McKenzie - The Pianist
John Caesar - The Policeman

Plot
It is May 1923, and by chance James meets Diana Newbury at a club in London. However, minutes after they meet the Police raid the club, and James and Diana escape through a side room. Outside, they kiss passionately. Diana then asks James to stay with her in a cottage in Sandwich that she had been given to use for a week by Major and Mrs Cochrane-Danby. James agrees, and Edward accompanies him as his valet. Diana Newbury brings her lady's maid Miss Violet Marshall, who flirts with a non-responsive Edward.

Diana soon confesses that she still loves James, and has done ever since she was 13 years old. They discuss the idea of her leaving Bunny, James's best friend, and going to live abroad. Diana suggests going to France immediately, and she has already left a note at Bunny's club saying she has left him. However, Bunny returns earlier than expected and finds it. Bunny then goes to see Richard, who has returned from Scotland due to Bonar Law's resignation as Prime Minister. Richard then telephones James, and he and Diana are forced to return to London.

Bunny and James then meet, and Bunny says he will not divorce Diana, but he is happy to let Diana divorce him. However, James and Diana later agree they could not live together as they have both moved on. Diana then goes back to Bunny. Meanwhile, Violet delivers a note from Diana via Edward to James. It reads "Thank you for being such a saint. Bless you my darling. Goodbye. D". Once James had read this he screws it up.

Footnotes

References
Richard Marson, "Inside UpDown - The Story of Upstairs, Downstairs", Kaleidoscope Publishing, 2005
Updown.org.uk - Upstairs, Downstairs Fansite

Upstairs, Downstairs (series 5) episodes
1975 British television episodes
Fiction set in 1923